Al-Faris is a Sunni Arab  town in Dujail District in the Salah al-Din Governorate in Iraq.

Climate
In Al-Faris, there is a desert climate. Most rain falls in the winter. The Köppen-Geiger climate classification is BWh. About  of precipitation falls annually.

Faris